Little Hands may refer to:

 Little Hands (Jonathan Edwards album)
 Little Hands (Charlie Simpson album)
 Little Hands (2011 film), an Australian film directed by Claire McCarthy
Little Hands (2017 film), a live action short film directed by Rémi Allier